Love Your Garden is a British lifestyle gardening programme that was first broadcast on ITV on 10 June 2011. The show is hosted by Alan Titchmarsh alongside co-presenters David Domoney, Katie Rushworth and Frances Tophill and sees the team visit locations around the United Kingdom helping people to transform their gardens.

The first series saw Titchmarsh visiting themed gardens around the United Kingdom, specific to the topic of the episode, and advising viewers on how to transform their gardens. However, since the second series Titchmarsh and the team have transformed the gardens of people who are described as "deserving them the most".

Series overview

External links
Love Your Garden on YouTube
Love Your Garden on Twitter
Love Your Garden on WordPress
Love Your Garden on Facebook

2020s British television series
2011 British television series debuts
English-language television shows
ITV (TV network) original programming